Virgins is the seventh studio album by Canadian electronic musician Tim Hecker, released on October 14, 2013 by Kranky and Paper Bag Records.

Recording and production
Virgins was recorded during three periods in 2012, mostly in Reykjavik, Montreal and Seattle, using ensembles in live performance. A statement on Hecker's Bandcamp page elaborates:  "The sound palette of this work is wider, almost 'percussive' and tighter sounding than previous works. While this album remains committed to a painterly form of musical abstraction, it is also a record of restrained composition recorded live primarily in intimate studio rooms. This record employs woodwinds, piano and synthesizers towards an effort at doing what digital music does not do naturally—making music that is out of time, out of tune and out of phase."

Critical reception

Virgins received widespread critical acclaim upon its release. At Metacritic, which assigns a normalized rating out of 100 to reviews from mainstream critics, the album has received an average score of 87, based on 26 reviews, indicating "universal acclaim", and becoming Hecker's highest scoring album on the site.

Mike Powell of Pitchfork praised the album, stating, "This is music that benefits from being heard loud and/or on headphones in the same way couches are best experienced by actually sitting down in them instead of just brushing your fingers against the upholstery as you leave the room. Like a lot of Ben Frost’s albums (or something like Swans’ The Seer), Virgins feels possessed by the idea that no advancements in society or technology will ever shake our primal reactions to fear, wonder, awe and what in a more naïve era used to be called the sublime. And while it’s a fallacy to think that hyperseriousness is the only way to strike people at their core, it’s still inspiring to hear an artist—especially one who started out as mellow as Hecker—double down and make a statement so confrontational. Once haunted, now he’s the one who haunts."

Philip Sherburne of Spin gave the album a favorable review, stating, "Hecker's abstractions have never been more expressive than they are on Virgins, and his containers have never been more fraught. His main compositional principle might have come from the late philosopher Marshall Berman: All that is solid melts into air. There’s an exhilarating bleakness at the center of Virgins — the hollow at the heart of all things, nibbling inexorably away."

Virgins was a longlisted nominee for the 2014 Polaris Music Prize. The album placed fifth in The Wire magazine's annual critics' poll.

Track listing

Personnel
 Tim Hecker – mixing
 Ben Frost – performing, engineering
 Grímur Helgason – performing
 Kara-Lis Coverdale – performing
 Paul Matthew Moore – performing
 Valgeir Sigurðsson – performing, mixing
 Paul Corley – engineering
 Randall Dunn – engineering
 Mandy Parnell – mastering
 David Nakamoto – design, layout

References

Tim Hecker albums
2013 albums
Kranky albums
Paper Bag Records albums